Jabeen Jalil is a former Indian actress who primarily worked in Hindi language films. She appeared in a number of Hindi films such as New Delhi (1956), Raagini (1958), Bedard Zamana Kya Jaane, Panchayat (1956), Batwara, Katil Kaun, Jagga Daku, Khilari, Zingaro etc. She appeared in a total of 23 Hindi and four Punjabi films in her career spanning almost 20 years.

Career
Jabeen was discovered by actors Nigar Sultana and Dilip Kumar who were the guests in her college's cultural function and were impressed by her potential skills. They suggested her to pursue her career in acting. She debuted with the film 'Raat Ki Rani' (1953) opposite Shammi Kapoor. She appeared in several good films throughout the 1950s and early 1960s like New Delhi (1956), Raagini (1958) etc. in supporting roles. She won the National Film Award for Best Actress for her performance in Punjabi film ‘Chaudhary Karnail Singh’ in 1960, in which Prem Chopra was paired with her. Vachan (1974) was her last film appearance.

References

Year of birth missing (living people)
Indian film actresses
Actresses in Hindi cinema
Living people